Roza Maveltovna Uchkempirova (born August 15, 1943) is a Kyrgyzstani economist and government official.

Uchkempirova is a native of Karakol. In 1965 she graduated from the Faculty of Economics at the Kyrgyzstan State University. That same year she began to work at Taxi Fleet No. 1 in Frunze, today Bishkek. In 1970 she became a graduate student at the Institute of Economics at the Kyrgyzstan Academy of Sciences. From 1974 she was a research fellow at the State Planning Committee of the Kyrgyz SSR; four years later she became head of the Department of Optimization of Development and Location of Industry, following this by becoming head of the Department of Culture, Education and Health of the State Planning Committee of the Kyrgyz SSR. In December 1993 Uchkempirova took over the director-generalship of the Social Fund of the Kyrgyz Republic. She remained in the position when it converted to a chairmanship in 1994, and again in 1999 when it became a ministry. She continued at the Fund until February, 1999, when she resigned as minister over accusations of financial mismanagement. During her time there she worked on numerous plans related to education, pensions and health. Uchkempirova next became general director of Socium Consult Ltd in 2001, and returned to government as chair of the Supervisory Board at the Ministry of Health from 2011 until 2014. More recently, she has concerned herself with efforts to refinance education in Kyrgyzstan; she has also spoken of a need to encourage transparency in government operations and reform the health care system of the country. Uchkempirova has two children: a son, born in 1965, and a daughter, born in 1970.

References

1943 births
Living people
Kyrgyzstani economists
Government ministers of Kyrgyzstan
Women government ministers of Kyrgyzstan
20th-century economists
20th-century Kyrgyzstani women politicians
20th-century Kyrgyzstani politicians
21st-century economists
People from Issyk-Kul Region
Kyrgyz National University alumni